Bill Bedford (19 February 1908 – 4 November 1973) was an  Australian rules footballer who played with Fitzroy in the Victorian Football League (VFL).

Notes

External links 
		

1908 births
1973 deaths
Australian rules footballers from Victoria (Australia)
Fitzroy Football Club players
Port Melbourne Football Club players